The Lamb–Chaplygin dipole model is a mathematical description for a particular inviscid and steady dipolar vortex flow. It is a non-trivial solution to the two-dimensional Euler equations. The model is named after Horace Lamb and Sergey Alexeyevich Chaplygin, who independently discovered this flow structure. This dipole is the two-dimensional analogue of Hill's spherical vortex.


The model
A two-dimensional (2D), solenoidal vector field  may be described by a scalar stream function , via , where  is the right-handed unit vector perpendicular to the 2D plane. By definition, the stream function is related to the vorticity  via a Poisson equation:  . The Lamb–Chaplygin model follows from demanding the following characteristics: 

 The dipole has a circular atmosphere/separatrix with radius : .
 The dipole propages through an otherwise irrorational fluid ( at translation velocity .    
 The flow is steady in the co-moving frame of reference: .
 Inside the atmosphere, there is a linear relation between the vorticity and the stream function 

The solution  in cylindrical coordinates, in the co-moving frame of reference reads:

where  are the zeroth and first Bessel functions of the first kind, respectively.

Usage and considerations
Since the seminal work of P. Orlandi, the Lamb–Chaplygin vortex model has been a popular choice for numerical studies on vortex-environment interactions. The fact that it does not deform make it a prime candidate for consistent flow initialization. A less favorable property is that the second derivative of the flow field at the dipole's edge is not continuous. Further, it serves a framework for stability analysis on dipolar-vortex structures.

References 

Fluid dynamics